Virserum is a locality situated in Hultsfred Municipality, Kalmar County, Sweden with 1,742 inhabitants in 2010. Prior to 1971 it was a köping. The history of Virserum goes back to the Middle Ages, and in the 1950s the town was a centre for the furniture industry.
In the village of Bösebo, 10 km east of Virserum you can find evidence of settlement from 2500 B.C.

Gallery

References 

Populated places in Kalmar County
Populated places in Hultsfred Municipality